The Roman Catholic Archdiocese of Cardiff is an archdiocese of the Latin Church of the Catholic Church which covers the south-east portion of Wales and the county of Herefordshire in England. The Metropolitan Province of Cardiff therefore covers all of Wales and part of England. Cardiff's suffragan dioceses are the Diocese of Menevia and the Diocese of Wrexham.

History

The origin of the modern diocese can be traced to 1840 when the Apostolic Vicariate of the Welsh District was created out the Western District of England and Wales. The Welsh District consisted the whole of Wales and the county of Herefordshire. When Pope Pius IX judged that the time was right to re-establish the Catholic hierarchy in Wales and England in 1850, the southern half of the Welsh District became the Diocese of Newport and Menevia and was a suffragan of the Archdiocese of Birmingham. It had its pro-cathedral at Belmont Abbey. In 1895, boundaries were redrawn, and the territory covering Glamorgan, Monmouthshire and Herefordshire was named the Diocese of Newport. Finally, in 1916, without further adjustment of boundaries, the territory was raised to the status of an archdiocese, and given the title Archdiocese of Cardiff. The Episcopal Seat is now located in Cardiff, at St David's Cathedral.

Timeline
As all of the Roman Catholic dioceses in Wales are part of the ecclesiastical province of Cardiff the history of the archdiocese and its suffragan dioceses are intertwined:
 29 September 1850: Universalis Ecclesiae: The Roman Catholic Church in Wales is split between the Diocese of Shrewsbury in the north and the Diocese of Newport and Menevia in the south.
 1852: Francis Richard Wegg-Prosser, a landowner in Hereford, converts to Catholicism.
 15 February 1854: Wegg-Prosser sets about building a church and the foundation stone is laid on his Belmont estate.
 1857: Construction of the Belmont monastic buildings starts.
 21 November 1859: Most of it is built and it becomes a Benedictine priory. The abbey continues to be enlarged (chancel extended in 1865).
 4 September 1860: The cathedral priory is consecrated.
 4 July 1895: The Diocese of Newport and Menevia splits. Glamorgan, Monmouth and Herefordshire become the Diocese of Newport. The rest of Wales, including North Wales from the Diocese of Shrewsbury, becomes the Apostolic Vicariate of Wales.
 12 May 1898: The Apostolic Vicariate of Wales become the Diocese of Menevia with its pro-cathedral in Wrexham.
 7 February 1916: The Diocese of Newport becomes the Archdiocese of Cardiff and it is decided that St David's Church in Cardiff would become the cathedral.
 12 March 1920: St David's Cathedral, Cardiff is officially made the metropolitan cathedral.
 12 February 1987: The Diocese of Menevia is split. The north becomes the Diocese of Wrexham with its cathedral remaining in Wrexham. The south remains the Diocese of Menevia and sets up Swansea Cathedral.

Overview
The current ecclesiastical territory of the diocese comprises the local government areas of Cardiff, Bridgend, Vale of Glamorgan, Newport, Torfaen, Blaenau Gwent, Monmouthshire, Merthyr Tydfil, Rhondda Cynon Taff and Herefordshire. Altogether there are 61 parishes. On 19 April 2011, George Stack was appointed to succeed Peter Smith, who was translated to Southwark in 2010. He was installed as Archbishop on 20 June 2011.

Bishops

Ordinaries

Vicars Apostolic of the Welsh District
 Thomas Joseph Brown, O.S.B. (Appointed on 5 June 1840 – Became Bishop of Newport and Menevia on 29 September 1850)

Bishops of Newport and Menevia
 Thomas Joseph Brown, O.S.B. (Appointed on 29 September 1850 – Died on 12 April 1880)
 John Cuthbert Hedley, O.S.B. (Appointed on 18 February 1881 - from 1895, Bishop of Newport only – Died on 11 November 1915)

Archbishops of Cardiff
 James Romanus Bilsborrow, O.S.B. (Appointed on 7 February 1916 – Resigned on 16 December 1920)
 Francis Edward Joseph Mostyn (Appointed on 7 March 1921 – Died on 25 October 1939)
 Michael Joseph McGrath (Appointed on 20 June 1940 – Died on 28 February 1961)
 John Aloysius Murphy (Appointed on 22 August 1961 – Retired on 25 March 1983)
 John Aloysius Ward, O.F.M. Cap. (Appointed on 25 March 1983 – Resigned on 26 October 2001)
 Peter David Smith (Appointed on 26 October 2001 – Translated to Southwark on 30 April 2010)
 George Stack (Appointed on 19 April 2011 – 20 June 2022)
 Mark O'Toole (Appointed 27 April 2022. Installed on 20 June 2022)

Auxiliary Bishops
John Edward Cuthbert Hedley, O.S.B. (1873-1881), appointed Bishop here
Daniel Joseph Mullins (1970-1987), appointed Bishop of Menevia, Wales

Other priests of this diocese who became bishops
Daniel Joseph Hannon, appointed Bishop of Menevia, Wales in 1941
David James Mathew, appointed auxiliary bishop of Westminster, England in 1938
Edwin Regan, appointed Bishop of Wrexham, Wales in 1994
Francis John Vaughan, appointed Bishop of Menevia, Wales in 1926

Deaneries 
There are a total of six deaneries in the Archdiocese of Cardiff, each of which cover several churches in that area, overseen by a dean.

The deaneries include:
 Bridgend Deanery
 Cardiff Deanery
 Hereford Deanery
 Newport Deanery
 North Gwent Deanery
 Pontypridd Deanery

References

External links
Archdiocese of Cardiff website
Cardiff Metropolitan Cathedral
Wales and the Marches Catholic History Society
Cardiff Catholic Archives
GCatholic.org
Catholic Hierarchy

 
Cardiff
Pope Pius IX
Cardiff
1840 establishments in the United Kingdom
Roman Catholic Ecclesiastical Province of Cardiff